is a Japanese adult visual novel developed by August for Windows and was released on April 28, 2011. Aiyoku no Eustia is August's eighth game, preceded by Fortune Arterial and Yoake Mae yori Ruriiro na: Moonlight Cradle. It was planned to be released on March 25, but the schedule was changed due to the Great East Japan earthquake. An enhanced port for the PlayStation Vita titled Aiyoku no Eustia: Angel's Blessing was released on June 26, 2014. The game was released exclusively in Japan for the Nintendo Switch and PlayStation 4 on June 23, 2022. Two manga volumes based on Aiyoku no Eustia were published by Kadokawa Shoten. Novels, comic anthologies and drama CD's have also been released.

The title is a play on words: the actual Kanji used are ai (穢, dirty) and yoku (翼, wing), rendering the primary meaning of "Eustia of the Tarnished Wings". However, aiyoku is a homonym in Japanese, and also means "worldly passion" or "lust" (愛欲). Accordingly, the alternate reading is "Eustia of Passion", which is an allusion to events within the game.

Plot
Years ago, when the Saint's prayer was interrupted, an incident known as the "Gran Forte" occurred, causing a portion of the land to fall and split the lower city into two, separated by a cliff. Countless lives and property were lost or irreversibly affected in what would be known as the greatest disaster in the city's history.

In time, the lowest layer, known as the "Prison", became the home to people who lost much of their former lives during the "Gran Forte". Crime, famine, and disease run rampant, with "The Noncorroding Gold Chains", the ruling organization in the area specializing in the sex trade, keeping what little order that still exists. Meanwhile, a contagious disease which causes the infected to grow wings has spread throughout the city, and a unit commonly known as the "Wing Hunters" has been formed to deal with these people swiftly and often violently.

In this "Prison" resides Caim Astraea, a freelance ex-assassin who does odd jobs for his friend, the head of "The Noncorroding Gold Chains", for money. During one request, Caim finds Eustia, a winged girl who emits the pale purple light characteristic of the "Gran Forte" incident years ago. His encounter with Eustia will take him on a journey which will involve him with the most influential bodies of the city, including the Church and the royal government. As he searches for the meaning to his cruel, difficult life, he will discover the deepest and darkest secrets of Novus Aither.

Characters

Main heroines
 Eustia Astraea
  (video game), Yoshino Nanjo (Drama CD, PS Vita)
 The title character. Eustia (or Tia as she is usually called) is found by Caim as the only survivor of a grisly murder scene. An orphan for as long as she could remember, Tia grew up under harsh conditions, having worked as a slave for a noble family before being sold to the Golden Chains in "Prison" as a prostitute. She is found to have the wing disease, although her wings are markedly different from the others; it is quickly revealed that Tia is a special winged case and may possess supernatural powers.
 Eris Floralia
  (video game), Yuu Asakawa (Drama CD, PS Vita)
 The only female doctor in Prison who lives and works in the prostitute area. She was redeemed (purchased so that she did not have to work as a prostitute) by Caim and as a result became totally devoted to him. She is noted for her beauty and intelligence but is also well known for her sharp tongue and cold personality which only Caim is spared from. Caim wants nothing more than for Eris to treasure her freedom and live independently; Eris, however, wants nothing more than to be with and serve Caim.
 Saint Irene
  (video game), Tae Okajima (Drama CD, PS Vita)
 The current Saint, Irene the 29th is gifted with a way with words and incredible strength of faith. Originally a homeless girl, she met Lavria, who would become a sister figure to her, on the streets. The Church would eventually take them both under its wing; she was selected to be the new Saint, to offer constant prayer on behalf of everyone in Novus Aether, after Irene the 28th was executed for interrupting her prayer and causing the "Gran Forte".
 Licia de novus Yurii
  (video game), Eriko Nakamura (Drama CD, PS Vita)
 The current princess of Novus Aether and successor to the throne, Licia is a young, mischievous girl with little interest in the politics of her country, leaving the decision-making to the House of Nobles and its head, Gilbert. She is, however, very interested in what the "Prison" and the lower city are like (though she is terribly misinformed in this matter) and loves to do servant work such as hanging laundry and cooking.
 Fione Silvaria
  (video game), Yuka Saito (Drama CD, PS Vita)
 The captain of the "Wing Hunters", Fione is a skilled swordswoman who has a very strong sense of responsibility and justice and as such, she clings on very strongly to her beliefs, which makes her come off as stubborn and inflexible. Her idealism often tends to clash with Caim's cynicism.

Supporting characters
 Caim Astraea
  (video game), Takashi Kondō (Drama CD, PS Vita)
 The main protagonist. He lost all of his friends and family in the Gran Forte and was taken in by the then head of the Golden Chain who had him trained as an assassin. He eventually earned his freedom and now works as a freelancer, his primary client being the now head of the Golden Chain, Sieg, his closest friend who is something of a brother to him as they were more or less raised together in the Golden Chain by Sieg's father, the former head. Despite still mainly working for the Golden Chain, he no longer takes on jobs where he has to kill. His training as an assassin has made him an extremely competent fighter and his life in Prison has made him cynical and pragmatic. His initial interest in Eustia is sparked by the light she gave off when he first saw her, a light he had only seen before during the Gran Forte.
 Lucius dis Mireille
  (video game), Hiroki Takahashi (Drama CD, PS Vita)
 A young noble and overseer of the "Wing Hunters" who has quickly gained recognition and power among the governing nobles. He is concerned with the corruption of the government and diligently working to improve the life of all citizens of Novus Aether.
 Siegfried Grado
  (video game), Shinichiro Miki (Drama CD, PS Vita)
 The current leader of the "Gold Chains", son of the creator and previous leader, and Caim's close friend. The two of them share a long past, having worked as assassins and escaped from countless dangers together. He's usually laid back around Caim, Melt and Eris but as the leader of the Gold Chains he's serious, efficient and ruthless.
 Melt Logtie
  (video game), Junko Asami (Drama CD, PS Vita)
 A wildly successful prostitute in her day, the previous leader of the "Gold Chains" eventually bought her for himself. She now runs a bar and restaurant that Caim and Siegfried both regularly visit on Prostitute Street in the "Prison".
 Sistina Uyl
  (video game), Hana Takeda (Drama CD, PS Vita)
 Sistina is Lucius's adjutant.
 Lavria
  (video game), Atsumi Tanezaki (Drama CD, PS Vita)
 St. Irene the 29th's personal servant, Lavria is a timid girl who is torn between supporting St. Irene's beliefs and obeying the orders of the Church ministers to keep St. Irene in check.
 Claudia
  (video game), Yukari Honma (Drama CD, PS Vita)
 Currently the Golden Chain's most popular prostitute, she is beautiful, gentle and graceful but known for being sadistic when working.
 Risa
  (video game), Saki Nakajima (Drama CD, PS Vita)
 Another prostitute of the Golden Chains. She is friends with Claudia and Iris and has a very cheerful and energetic personality.
 Iris
  (video game), Ai Fukuda (Drama CD, PS Vita)
 Another prostitute of the Golden Chains. She is young and has a fragile appearance which contrasts sharply with her personality as she casually insults people and uses foul language in a nearly unchanging monotone.
 Gau Lugeira
  (video game), Hyo-Sei (Drama CD, PS Vita)
 Gau is a superior swordswoman.
 Lang Scrope
  (video game), Kisho Taniyama (Drama CD, PS Vita)
 Lang is a vice-leader of Fione's corps.
 Nudar Atraid
  (video game), Noriaki Sugiyama (Drama CD, PS Vita)
 Nudar is the head priest / bishop of the church of Saint Irene.
 Varrius Meisner
  (video game, Drama CD, PS Vita)
 Varrius is the captain of the Palace Guard.
 Gilbert dis Balstein
  (video game), Keiji Fujiwara (Drama CD, PS Vita)
 Gilbert is the top administrator of "Novus Aither".
 Oz
  (video game, Drama CD, PS Vita)
 Oz is Siegfried's confidant.
 Cougar Silvaria
  (video game), Yasunori Matsumoto (Drama CD, PS Vita)
 Cougar is Fione's older brother.
 Bernado
  (video game), Unknown (Drama CD)
 Bernado is a leader of "Fūshō". Bernado was a vice-leader of "Fushokukinsa".

Media

Manga
A manga adaptation entitled Aiyoku no Eustia was published by Kadokawa Shoten in June 2012. The manga was written by August, and illustrated by Monaco Sena. It began serialization in an issue of the Comp Ace magazine. Two volumes have been produced. The manga series originally ran from June 2012 to August 2013. Ichijinsha has published an Aiyoku no Eustia Comic Anthology, which was released on July 25, 2011.

Novels
Harvest has publicized an Aiyoku no Eustia novel series, consisting of five volumes written by Sasa Miyachiruda. Each volume focuses on a different heroine's scenario. The first volume, Kegare Tsubasa no Yūsutia Kuroki Hane was published on November 25, 2011, the second volume, Kegare Tsubasa no Yūsutia Aoki Tsuki, was published on December 20, 2011. The third volume, Kegare Tsubasa no Yūsutia Shiroki Seijo, was published on February 2, 2012, and the two final volumes, Kegare Tsubasa no Yūsutia Kin'iro no Ōjo, and Kegare Tsubasa no Yūsutia Konton no Tenshi, were published on March 25, 2012, and June 20, 2012. A novel entitled Kegare Tsubasa no Yūsutia Auld Lang Syne, written by Okita Kazuhiko, was published by Paradigm on December 22, 2011.

Drama CD
Geneon Universal has released an audio drama series for Aiyoku no Eustia, containing six chapters, the first chapter was released on October 26, 2011, and the last chapter was released on August 10, 2012.

Development
Aiyoku no Eustia is August's eighth project, which was developed after other August games such as Yoake Mae yori Ruriiro na and Fortune Arterial. The scenario for Aiyoku no Eustia was written by Taku Sakakibara. The art and character designs were handled by Bekkankō. The movie production was managed by Yuki Kitagawa, and the music was managed by a music production company called Active Planets.

Release history
On December 24, 2010, the first trial edition, Aiyoku no Eustia - Tech Gian Super Prelude, was made available on platform Windows, with an age rating of 15+. Two other trials were released in Japan also, one on December 28, 2010, and the other on January 14, 2011, the age rating changed to 17+. On April 28, 2011, the first press edition was released, followed by a regular edition for Aiyoku no Eustia, which was made available on Windows in the same year, July 29. Both shared an age rating of 18+. Aiyoku no Eustia: Angel's Blessing was released for PlayStation Vita on June 26, 2014.

Music
Two maxi singles were released for the opening and ending themes on April 28, 2011. The first contained the opening theme  by Ceui and the insert song . The second one contained the ending theme  by Ceui and the insert song  by Ami Fujisaki.

Reception
Famitsu gave the PlayStation Vita version of the game a review score of 29/40.

References

External links
  
 

2011 video games
2014 video games
Bishōjo games
Eroge
Japan-exclusive video games
Kadokawa Shoten manga
Manga based on video games
PlayStation Vita games
Romance video games
Seinen manga
Video games developed in Japan
Visual novels
Windows games
August (company) games